Renee Cole (born  1971) is a former American beauty pageant contestant who was crowned Miss Maryland 1993.

References

1970s births
Living people
American beauty pageant winners
Miss America 1994 delegates
People from Bowie, Maryland
Year of birth uncertain